Aspergillus gorakhpurensis is a species of fungus in the genus Aspergillus. It is from the Cremei section. The species was first described in 1969.

Growth and morphology

A. gorakhpurensis has been cultivated on both Czapek yeast extract agar (CYA) plates and Malt Extract Agar Oxoid® (MEAOX) plates. The growth morphology of the colonies can be seen in the pictures below.

References 

gorakhpurensis
Fungi described in 1969